Arediou is a village located in the Nicosia District of Cyprus. A developing village which has the advantage of "Arediou intercity Bus Station" connecting the province villages with the  suburbs of Nicosia.

History
Although the area has been inhabited since ancient times  the present Arediou founded by residents of nearby old settlements and agricultural land tenants during Frankish-rule (1200-1490).

It is estimated that about three quarters of the population of nearby old settlements were lost, whole villages were burned when the Black Death struck in the decades of 1340 and 1370, thus changing the demographic character of the area.

The village's name is associated with the name of Arras-Du-Joan's. Arras-Du was a middleman for the nobles and peasants, and seasonal workers agent. The name was established for the reason that the location was called the manor of Arras Du. in Turkish, the name of the village pronounced Arradiou. Finally, the name came to be Arediou.

With the Ottoman conquest of the island in 1570, began the process of Islamization, "designed to reduce the Christian population". In 1591, few Christian families from Kouloupades hamlets converted to Islam (Turkish Cypriots), in exchange for the privilege of the Koutis river waters and Lord Arras estates and settled in Arediou.

All Turkish Cypriot residents abandoned the village, during the outbreak of hostilities between the Greek and Turkish in 1964.

References

Bibliography 
De Mas Latrie, Louis: Histoire de l'île de Chypre
Boustronios, Georgios: Chronicle Cyprus
Menardos, Simos: Topographical and Folkloric Studies

Communities in Nicosia District